Dream On may refer to:

Film and television
 Dream On (film), a 2016 documentary starring John Fugelsang
 Dream On (30 for 30), a 2022 TV documentary about the US women's national basketball team of the mid-1990s
 Dream On (TV series), a 1990–1996 American sitcom

Television episodes
 "Dream On" (Beavis and Butt-Head), 1995
 "Dream On" (Degrassi High), 1989
 "Dream On" (Glee), 2010
 "Dream On" (Stitch & Ai), 2017
 "Dream On" (Thomas & Friends), 2007

Literature
 Dream On, a 2014 novel by Kerstin Gier
 Dream On, a 2002 novel by Bali Rai

Music
 Dream On (record label), a defunct label founded by Kid Cudi, Plain Pat, and Emile Haynie

Albums
 Dream On (album), by George Duke, or the title song, 1982
 Dream On, by Alice Boman, 2020
 Dream On, by Ernie Haase & Signature Sound, 2008
 Dream On, a disc in the deluxe edition of Katy Perry's album Teenage Dream, 2010

Songs
 "Dream On" (Aerosmith song), 1973 
 "Dream On" (Amy Macdonald song), 2017
 "Dream On" (Christian Falk song), 2006
 "Dream On" (Depeche Mode song), 2001
 "Dream On" (Joan Kennedy song), 1993
 "Dream On" (Naoya Urata song), 2010
 "Dream On" (Nazareth song), 1982
 "Dream On" (Noel Gallagher's High Flying Birds song), 2012
 "Dream On" (The Righteous Brothers song), 1974; covered by the Oak Ridge Boys, 1979
 "Dream On (An Indian Lullaby)", written by Buddy DeSylva and Victor Herbert, 1922
 "Dream On", by Blackfoot from Tomcattin', 1980
 "Dream On", by Brotherhood of Man from Love and Kisses from Brotherhood of Man, 1976
 "Dream On", by the Chemical Brothers from Surrender, 1999
 "Dream On", by Dusty Springfield from Living Without Your Love, 1979
 "Dream On", by Gaither Vocal Band
 "Dream On", by Gotthard from Lipservice, 2005
 "Dream On", by Praise, 2000
 "Dream On", by Screaming Jets from Tear of Thought, 1992